Steve Hodges (born February 2, 1949) is an American politician, teacher, and former small business owner from the state of Missouri. Hodges has served as a member of the Missouri House of Representatives since being elected in November 2006. A Democrat, he represented the 149th District, which includes all of New Madrid County as well as portions of Mississippi County and Pemiscot County from 2007 to 2015.

Biography
Born in Cape Girardeau, Missouri, Hodges was raised in East Prairie, Missouri and is a graduate of East Prairie High School. Following high school he attended Southeast Missouri State University, where he received a bachelor's degree in business administration, and the University of Missouri, where he obtained a Master of Business Administration.

Prior to entering politics Hodges spent thirty years in as manager and owner of an East Prairie supermarket. When not involved with his legislative duties he works as a substitute teacher and a referee for various high school sports. He served on his local school board for twelve years before seeking election to the Missouri House of Representatives in 2006, winning his election. In 2012, he defeated local opera singer and America's Got Talent winner Neal E. Boyd to be re-elected to the Missouri House.

On February 16, 2013, he was chosen by Democratic Party leaders from southeast Missouri to run in a special election for Missouri's 8th congressional district to succeed   U.S. Representative Jo Ann Emerson, who had resigned. Hodges came in second in the race while Jason Smith won the race. He is a conservative Democrat who opposes abortion and gun control, but has said he is a Democrat because he has a "social conscience".

In the early morning hours of February 6, 2014 Representative Hodges was arrested on suspicion of drunk driving by police in Jefferson City, Missouri. When asked for comment on the incident Hodges told the Associated Press he had stopped in a parking lot and fell on some ice when exiting the vehicle. Unable to get to his feet, an ambulance and police were summoned to the scene. The state representative was transported to an area hospital where he was treated and released for unspecified injuries. It was then he was arrested but was not jailed. No charges have as yet been formally filed. Hodges issued a statement admitting that he had been drinking on the evening of February 5 but did not feel he was legally intoxicated. He apologized for the incident and said he is looking into receiving counseling.

Personal
Hodges and his former wife Amy have three sons. The couple divorced in 2014 after 41 years of matrimony. His son Andrew was the valedictorian of his class at the United States Military Academy at West Point.

References

1949 births
Democratic Party members of the Missouri House of Representatives
Southeast Missouri State University alumni
University of Missouri alumni
People from Mississippi County, Missouri
American grocers
Living people
American United Methodists